Shreemaan Aashique is a 1993 Indian Bollywood film directed by Deepak Anand and produced by Shakeel Noorani. The film stars Rishi Kapoor, Urmila Matondkar in lead roles.

Plot 
Dushyant Kumar Mehra promises his uncle Professor Vishwamitra who runs an association of confirmed single men that he will remain single forever. His stance is a cause for concern for his parents, Kalidas Mehra and Suman Mehra. Dushyant travels to a hill station on a holiday and runs into Shakuntala who falls in love with him. He rebuffs her but she persists and soon he reciprocates her love. Professor Vishwamitra is very upset when he learns of this. What complicates matters further is that the professor himself falls in love with Shakuntala. Eventually Dushyant and Shakuntala end up together.

Inspiration 
This film's plot is strikingly similar to that of Shagird (1967).

Cast
Rishi Kapoor as Dushyant Kumar Mehra
Urmila Matondkar as Shakuntala "Shaku" 
Bindu as Menka
Tiku Talsania as Kalidas Mehra
Reema Lagoo as Suman Mehra
Anupam Kher as Professor Vishwamitra
Mehmood as Menka's father
Ghanshyam Rohera as Ashutosh Mukherjee
Dinesh Hingoo as Anand (Army Man)
Annu Kapoor as Masterji

Soundtrack
The soundtrack of the film was composed by Nadeem–Shravan. The song "Ladki Ladki" is copied from the Arabic song "Didi" (1992) by Algerian musician Khaled.

References

External links

1993 films
1990s Hindi-language films
Films scored by Nadeem–Shravan